Marnette Provost Patterson (born April 26, 1980) is an American actress and singer.

Early life
Patterson was raised as an only child by her mother in Los Angeles, California, where she was born. Her name is her mother's middle name: Marnette. Her aunt is Dana Dillaway, former child actress who appeared in Giant (1956) as Elizabeth Taylor's and Rock Hudson's daughter Judy (age 4), along with a couple of Twilight Zone episodes.

In 1986, she played "Dorrie"  in Mama's Family, 'Santa Mama' (S3-E13) a little girl who asked Santa for things just for her family.

In 1989, Patterson was the junior vocalist winner on Star Search.

Career
Patterson has appeared in films such as Camp Nowhere (1994). 
In 1996, Patterson appeared briefly as a volleyball schoolgirl attracting the attentions of Tommy in the premiere episode of 3rd Rock From The Sun.
From 1996–1998 Patterson portrayed Nicole Farrell on the NBC series Something So Right.
Patterson starred in the short-lived WB sitcom Movie Stars and the made-for-TV movie The Stalking of Laurie Show. Patterson made appearance in That '70s Show as Shelly in the episode: "Eric's Panties" in 2000. Who's Your Daddy? (2003), Pope Dreams (2005), and Cloud 9 (2005). She also voiced Lucy van Pelt in It's Christmastime Again, Charlie Brown and It's Spring Training, Charlie Brown. In 2004, Patterson appeared on Grounded for Life as an underage drinker. In 2005, she guest starred on Supernatural as a high school student, Charlie, in the episode Bloody Mary.

In 2006, Patterson landed the role of Christy Jenkins on the eighth and final season of Charmed. Her character was a witch who was kidnapped by demons as a child and had been held captive in The Underworld for many years. Her sister, Billie Jenkins, played by Kaley Cuoco, sought help of the Charmed ones to rescue Christy.

Patterson also portrayed Holly Little in the 2008 film Starship Troopers 3: Marauder. She then starred as Maggie Schaffer on the web series, called LG15: The Resistance. In 2009, she appeared on an episode of the TV series House, where she starred as Ashley. In 2011, she appeared briefly on an episode of The Mentalist ("Every Rose Has Its Thorn") as a con artist who would sleep with wealthy men and then blackmail them. Her character was named Naomi/Victoria. Patterson is close friends with Jennifer Finnigan, her co-star on The Stalking of Laurie Show.

Personal life
Patterson's charity work includes an animal advocacy group called the Amanda Foundation. Her hobbies include singing, horseback riding, hiking, kickboxing, and cooking.

On September 4, 2011, she married James Verzino, a financial advisor at Northwestern Mutual Los Angeles, at a ranch in Malibu, California. They have two children, a son, Hudson, and a daughter, London.

Filmography

Film

Television

Awards and nominations

References

External links
 
 
 

1980 births
Living people
20th-century American actresses
21st-century American actresses
Actresses from Los Angeles
American child actresses
American film actresses
American television actresses